West Virginia's 16th Senate district is one of 17 districts in the West Virginia Senate. It is currently represented by Democrat Hannah Geffert and Republican Patricia Rucker. All districts in the West Virginia Senate elect two members to staggered four-year terms.

Geography
District 16 covers all of Jefferson County and parts of Berkeley County at the far eastern edge of the state's Eastern Panhandle. Communities within the district include Martinsburg, Charles Town, Ranson, Bolivar, Harpers Ferry, Shepherdstown, and Shannondale.

The district is located entirely within West Virginia's 2nd congressional district, and overlaps with the 59th, 60th, 61st, 62nd, 63rd, 64th, 65th, 66th, and 67th districts of the West Virginia House of Delegates. It borders the states of Maryland and Virginia.

Recent election results

2022
Incumbent Democratic senator Hannah Geffert, who was appointed in 2021 upon the resignation of John Unger, did not seek election to a full term, and no fellow Democrat filed to replace her.

Historical election results

2020

2018

2016

2014

2012

Federal and statewide results in District 16

References

16
Berkeley County, West Virginia
Jefferson County, West Virginia